ScatSat-1 (Scatterometer Satellite-1) was a satellite providing weather forecasting, cyclone prediction, and tracking services to India. It has been developed by ISRO Satellite Centre, Bangalore whereas its payload was developed by Space Applications Centre, Ahmedabad. The satellite carries a Ku-band scatterometer similar to the Oceansat-2 which became dysfunctional after its life span of four-and-a-half years. India was dependent on NASA's ISS-RapidScat for prediction of cyclone forecasting and weather prediction. The data generated by this mini-satellite are used by National Aeronautics and Space Administration (NASA), European Organisation for the Exploitation of Meteorological Satellites (EUMETSAT) and National Oceanic and Atmospheric Administration (NOAA).

Instruments 
The designated primary instrument of the satellite was a scatterometer (OSCAT) which was similar to the instrument launched with Oceansat-2. This satellite measured the wind speed and its direction over the ocean.

Development 
Space Applications Centre (ASC) of ISRO was responsible for development of the instrument whereas ISRO Satellite Centre, Bangalore was responsible for the bus. ScatSat-1 was being built at 60% of the actual production cost and one-third of the actual predicted time. It was built using leftover parts of other satellite missions.

Launch 
The satellite was launched on 26 September 2016, at 03:42 UTC, from the first launch pad (FLP) of Satish Dhawan Space Centre, Sriharikota (SHAR) and launched by the PSLV-C35 launch vehicle the first multi-burn technology used by ISRO. The microsatellites Alsat-1B, AlSat-2B and BlackSky Pathfinder-1, and nanosatellites AlSat-1N, NLS-19, PISat and Pratham were launched along with ScatSat-1. It has been the longest Polar Satellite Launch Vehicle (PSLV) mission until date.

ScatSat-1 data 
ScatSat-1 data are made available to the public through via FTP from the Meteorological and Oceanographic Satellite Data Archive Center, an e-portal maintained by Space Application Centre, Indian Space Research Organisation (ISRO).

Near-real time level two ocean wind vectors on a  swath grid, based on the backscatter measurements of the ScatSat-1 are available through the e-portal of EUMETSAT.

End of mission 
Data services of ScatSat-1 were discontinued after an irrecoverable TWTA instrument failure occurred on 28 February 2021.

See also 

 QuikSCAT
 Oceansat-1
 Oceansat-2

References

External links 
 
 ScatSat-1 picture gallery

Spacecraft launched by India in 2016
Mini satellites of India
Weather satellites
Spacecraft launched by PSLV rockets
Earth observation satellites of India
Oceanographic satellites
Spacecraft decommissioned in 2021